The Khanate of Sibir 
(), also known as the Siberian Yurt or Khanate of Turan was a Tatar<ref>Исхаков Д. М. Тюркско-татарские государства XV—XVI вв. — Казань: Институт истории им. Ш. Марджани АН РТ, 2004.— Глава 2 — C. 32.</ref> Khanate located in southwestern Siberia with a Turco-Mongol ruling class. Throughout its history, members of the Shaybanid and Taibugid dynasties often contested the rulership over the Khanate between each other; both of these competing tribes were direct patrilineal descendants of Genghis Khan through his eldest son Jochi and Jochi's fifth son Shayban (Shiban) (died 1266). The area of the Khanate had once formed an integral part of the Mongol Empire, and later came under the control of the White Horde and the Golden Horde of 1242–1502.

The Khanate of Sibir had an ethnically diverse population of Turkic Siberian Tatars, Bashkirs, and speakers of various Uralic languages – including the Khanty, Mansi, and Selkup. The Sibir Khanate was the northernmost Muslim state in recorded history. 
Its defeat by Yermak Timofeyevich in 1582 marked the beginning of the Russian conquest of Siberia.

Aristocracy
The Sibir Khanate was administered by Mirzas (which is a noble title) who originated from various indigenous Siberian tribes. These Mirzas organized loosely knit dominions, which were all under the nominal authority of the Khan of Tyumen and Sibir. Mirzas also led the warriors of the Khanate of Sibir into battle and owed nominal allegiance to the Khan of Tyumen and Sibir.

Culture
Islam was the professed religion of the Sibir Khanate; it was the religion of the ruling Khan of Tyumen and Sibir. Grand mosques, palaces and fortified walls were constructed by the ruling class in both Tyumen and Sibir.

Islam was professed by not only the Khan but also the Mirzas, who were often educated in famous Islamic centers in Central Asia like Bukhara and Samarkand. However, shamanism and other traditional beliefs were practiced by much of the masses. Some groups practiced a form of Islam that incorporated elements of shamanism.

The leading Imams and Muftis of the Sibir Khanate are known to have had some influence in Kazan and Samarkand. The Khanate of Sibir was the northernmost Muslim state in recorded history.

The Khanate of Sibir had extensive trading connections with Central Asia and the Khanate of Kazan.

History

The area was originally inhabited by mainly Samoyedic and Ugrian peoples. In the 11th century, Kipchaks began inhabiting the region which led to the Turkification of the population. In the 13th century, the Mongols conquered the region and it was incorporated into the territory of the Golden Horde. Some of the Tatars who arrived with Batu Khan during the conquests settled in the area.

The Khanate of Sibir was founded in the fifteenth century, at a time when the Mongols of the house of Jochi were generally in a state of decline. The original capital of the Khans was Chimgi-Tura. The first Khan was Taibuga, who was a member of the Borjigin. He was succeeded by his son Khoja or Hoca, who was in turn succeeded by his son Mar.

The Taibugids' control of the region between the Tobol and middle Irtysh was not uncontested. The Shaybanids, descendants of Jochi, frequently claimed the area as their own. Ibak Khan, a member of a junior branch of the Shaybanid house, killed Mar and seized Chimgi-Tura. A Taibugid restoration occurred when Mar's grandson Muhammad fled to the eastern territories around the Irtysh and killed Ibak in battle in c. 1493. Muhammad decided not to remain at Chimgi-Tura, but chose a new capital named Iskar (or Sibir) located on the Irtysh.
The Russian conquest of Kazan in 1552 prompted the Taibugid Khan of Sibir, Yadigar, to seek friendly relations with Moscow. Yadigar, however, was challenged by a Shaybanid, Ibak's grandson Kuchum. Several years of fighting (1556–1563) ended with Yadigar's death and Kuchum becoming Khan.

Conquest of Sibir

Kuchum attempted to convert the Siberian Tatars, who were mostly shamanists, to Islam. His decision to conduct a raid on the Stroganov trading posts resulted in an expedition led by the Cossack Yermak against the Khanate of Sibir. Kuchum's forces were defeated by Yermak at the Battle of Chuvash Cape in 1582 and the Cossacks entered Iskar later that year. Kuchum reorganized his forces, killed Yermak in battle in 1584, and reasserted his authority over Sibir.
Over the next fourteen years, however, the Russians slowly conquered the Khanate. In 1598 Kuchum was defeated on the banks of the Ob and was forced to flee to the territories of the Nogai, bringing an end to his rule.

Taibugids and Shaybanids
The Khanate of Sibir and the town of Tyumen were founded by Taibuga probably some time between 1405 and 1428. The latter was probably of Keraite origin. However, some scholars also attempt to link the Taibugids to the Kipchak elites and others. Control alternated between the descendants of Taibuga and the Shaybanids who had descended from Genghis Khan. There are hints that the Shaybanids were more connected to the steppe nomads and that the Taibugids were more connected with the forest peoples to the north and east.

Taibuga's father was called On (On-Son, Onsom and other variants). Grousset says that they were 'the issue of Taibugha-bäki' without explanation ('bäki' (bek) was a princely suffix and Taibuqa was a Naiman chief at the time of Genghis Khan.) A few sources identify him with Bek Ondi Oglan, the great-great-great grandson of Shayban, and thus a Shaybanid. The Stroganov chronicle says that On was killed by a chief called Chingi who spared Taibuga, sent him to fight the Ostyaks and granted him his own principality. Taibuga founded Tyumen and named it Chingi-tura in honor of his benefactor. Another source says that when Tokhtamysh was defeated he fled to the 'land of Sibir' (the first mention of 'Sibir' in Russian chronicles). Here he was protected by On until both were killed by Edigu about 1405.

There is no more information about Taibuga except that some say he drove the Novgoroders from his lands.
In 1428 a 17-year old Shaybanid called Abu'l-Khayr Khan was chosen Khan on the Tura River (possibly at Tyumen). This implies that the Taibugids had been pushed aside. When he led his followers south for better things the remaining Shaybanids gathered around Ibak Khan, who was from a junior branch of the house. The Taibugids must have been restored because some time between 1464 and 1480 Ibak killed the Taibugid Mar and made himself Khan. In 1483 Fyodor Kurbsky is said to have led an army to the Irtysh River, but this had no lasting effects. Ibak went to the Volga where he killed the last Khan of the Golden Horde. Returning, he was killed by Mar's grandson called Mamuk or Makhmet or Mamet (about 1495). Makhmet moved the capital from Tyumen to Sibir and was briefly Khan of Kazan (1496). In 1552 the Taibugids Yediger and Bekbulat congratulated Ivan the Terrible on his conquest of Kazan. Later they paid limited tribute to Russia. In 1563 Ibak Khan's grandson Kuchum seized the throne from Yediger and Bekbulat. In 1573, following the Russo-Crimean War (1571) he stopped paying tribute and raided the Perm lands. In 1582, he was driven out by Yermak and died some time after 1600.

List of KhansList of Taibugids: 
 On
 Taibugha
 Khoja
 Mar (killed by Ibak)
 Obder (perhaps died as Ibak's captive)
 Makhmet/Mamuq (killed Ibak) 
 Abalak (son of Obder)
 Aguish 
 Kasim (son of Makhmet)
 Yadiger (killed by Kuchum) 
 Bekbulat (brother of Yadiger and possibly a co-regent)
 Seid Akhmat (reoccupied Sibir after Ermak's death, captured by the Tsardom of Russia in 1588).List of Shaybanids: 
 Ibak Khan
 Murtaza Khan
 Kuchum Khan
 Ali son of Kuchum (tried to reoccupy Sibir after Ermak's death), 
 Ishim (Asim?) son of Kuchum (married a Kalmyk & settled in their territory in 1620)

See also

 Siberian Tatars
 Indigenous peoples of Siberia
 List of Sibir khans
 Russian conquest of Siberia
 History of Siberia

References

 Forsyth, James. A History of the Peoples of Siberia: Russia's North Asian Colony 1581–1990.'' Cambridge University Press, 1992. 
 The West Siberian Tatars by Edward J. Vajda
 Timeline Siberia at Timelines of History by Algis Ratnikas

External links
 Siberian Tatars
 Sufism in Russia Today
 Russian "Conquest" 1580–1760
 Siberia Mapping
 Notes on the Russian Army of the 17th Century (1632–1698)
 Ancient Humans
 The Mansi
 Moscovite
 Sahanjar Soder

 
Sibir
Siberian Tatars
History of Siberia
Former monarchies of Asia
1468 establishments
States and territories established in 1468
Khanates